Neodietrichia is a monotypic genus of North American dwarf spiders containing the single species, Neodietrichia hesperia. It was first described by H. Özdikmen in 2008, and has only been found in Canada and the United States.

See also
 List of Linyphiidae species (I–P)

References

Linyphiidae
Monotypic Araneomorphae genera
Spiders of North America